Lilia del Valle (30 April 1928, in Mexico City – 7 January 2013, in Santo Domingo) was a Mexican actress, a star in the Golden Age of Mexican cinema. She appeared in films such as Las tres alegres comadres (1952) and Las interesadas (1952), together with Amalia Aguilar and Lilia Prado, Mis tres viudas alegres (1953) and Las cariñosas (1953) with Silvia Pinal, Nadie muere dos veces (1953), with Luis Aguilar and Abel Salazar, and Esposas infieles (1956).

Selected filmography
 The Beautiful Dreamer (1952)
 The Island of Women (1953)
 The Loving Women (1953)
 When You Come Back to Me (1953)

References

Mexican film actresses
1928 births
2013 deaths
Actresses from Mexico City